Wiry may refer to:

Places
Wiry, Lower Silesian Voivodeship (south-west Poland)
Wiry, Łódź Voivodeship (central Poland)
Wiry, Subcarpathian Voivodeship (south-east Poland)
Wiry, Greater Poland Voivodeship (west-central Poland)
Wiry, West Pomeranian Voivodeship (north-west Poland)
Wiry-au-Mont,  a commune in the Somme department in Hauts-de-France in northern France

Radio stations
 WIRY (AM), a radio station (1340 AM) licensed to serve Plattsburgh, New York, United States
 WPLA (FM), a radio station (100.7 FM) licensed to serve Plattsburgh West, New York, which held the call sign WIRY-FM from 2016 to 2020

Other uses
Thinness
Wiry the fairy, a character in The Fairly OddParents